Khawlah or Khawla is a feminine Arabic given name, meaning "female deer." Notable people named Khawlah or Khawla include:

Khawlah
Khawlah bint Ja'far
Khawlah bint Hakim
Khawla bint Tha'labah
Khawlah bint al-Azwar
Zainab Khawla

Khawla
Khawla Al Kuraya, Saudi physician and cancer specialist
Khawla al-Qazwini, Kuwaiti novelist
Khawla Hamdan al-Zahiri (born 1969), Omani short story writer
Khawla Armouti, Jordanian politician and the Minister of Social Development
Khawla Dunia, Syrian writer, researcher and humanitarian aid and relief organizer

See also 
Arabic name
 

Arabic feminine given names